Gangadhar National Award For Poetry is a literary award given in the field of literature for poetry by Sambalpur University. It is named after Gangadhar Meher. First award was given to Ali Sardar Jafri in the year 1991. Till now 31 poets have been awarded on various Indian languages.

History 
The award was first given in 1991 but the procedure of giving the award was started in 1989.

Procedure
There is a delay of one year due to a long process of choosing an awardee; if the awardee won the prize for 2019 then he gets his award in 2021, and the award of 2017 was given in 2019. It is awarded on the celebration day of Sambalpur University Foundation Day, which is celebrated every year in January.

Cash prize of Rs 50,000, angavastra, citation, a memento and a copy of Gangadhar Meher: Selected Works (An anthology of Gangadhar Meher's Poetry in English translation) is given to receipt of Gangadhar National Award.

Awardees

References

Notes 

Sambalpur University
Indian awards
Indian literary awards

1992 establishments in Orissa